A polarizing filter or polarising filter (see spelling differences) is often placed in front of the camera lens in photography in order to darken skies, manage reflections, or suppress glare from the surface of lakes or the sea. Since reflections (and sky-light) tend to be at least partially linearly-polarized, a linear polarizer can be used to change the balance of the light in the photograph. The rotational orientation of the filter is adjusted for the preferred artistic effect. For modern cameras, a circular polarizer (CPL) is typically used; this comprises firstly a linear polarizer which performs the artistic function just described, followed by a quarter-wave plate which further transforms the now-linearly polarized light into circularly-polarized light before entering the camera. This additional step avoids problems with autofocus and light-metering sensors within some cameras, which otherwise may not function reliably with a simple linear polarizer.

Use 

Light reflected from a non-metallic surface becomes polarized; this effect is maximum at Brewster's angle, about 56° from the vertical for common glass. A polarizer rotated to pass only light polarized in the direction perpendicular to the reflected light will absorb much of it. This absorption allows glare reflected from, for example, a body of water or a road to be reduced. Reflections from shiny surfaces (e.g. vegetation, sweaty skin, water surfaces, glass) are also reduced. This allows the natural color and detail of what is beneath to come through. Reflections from a window into a dark interior can be much reduced, allowing it to be seen through. (The same effects are available for vision by using polarizing sunglasses.)

Some of the light coming from the sky is polarized (bees use this phenomenon for navigation). 
The electrons in the air molecules cause a scattering of sunlight in all directions. This explains why the sky is not dark during the day. But when looked at from the sides, the light emitted from a specific electron is totally polarized. Hence, a picture taken in a direction at 90 degrees from the sun can take advantage of this polarization. Actually, the effect is visible in a band of 15° to 30° measured from the optimal direction.

Use of a polarizing filter, in the correct direction, will filter out the polarized component of skylight, darkening the sky;  the landscape below it, and clouds, will be less affected, giving a photograph with a darker and more dramatic sky, and emphasizing the clouds.  Perpendicularly incident light waves tend to reduce clarity and saturation of certain colors, which increases haziness. The polarizing lens effectively absorbs these light waves, rendering outdoor scenes crisper with deeper color tones in subject matter such as blue skies, bodies of water and foliage.

Much light is differentiated by polarization, e.g. light passing through crystals like sunstones (calcite) or water droplets producing rainbows.  The polarization of the rainbow is caused by the internal reflection. The rays strike the back surface of the drop close to the Brewster angle.

Polarizing filters can be rotated to maximize or minimize admission of polarized light. They are mounted in a rotating collar for this purpose; one need not screw or unscrew the filter to adjust the effect. Rotating the polarizing filter will make rainbows, reflections, and other polarized light stand out or nearly disappear depending on how much of the light is polarized and the angle of polarization.

The benefits of polarizing filters are the same in digital or film photography. While software post-processing can simulate many other types of filter, a photograph does not record the light polarization, so the effects of controlling polarization at the time of exposure cannot be replicated in software.

Types 

There are two types of polarizing filters readily available, linear and circular, which have exactly the same effect photographically. But the metering and auto-focus sensors in certain cameras, including virtually all auto-focus single-lens reflex cameras (SLRs), will not work properly with linear polarizers because the beam splitters used to split off the light for focusing and metering are polarization-dependent. Linearly-polarized light may also defeat the action of the anti-aliasing filter (low-pass filter) on the imaging sensor.

Circular polarizing photographic filters consist of a linear polarizer on the front, with a quarter-wave plate on the back. The quarter-wave plate converts the selected polarization to circularly polarized light inside the camera. This works with all types of cameras, because mirrors and beam-splitters split circularly polarized light the same way they split unpolarized light.

Linear polarizing filters can be easily distinguished from circular polarizers.  In linear polarizing filters, the polarizing effect works (rotate to see differences) regardless of which side of the filter the scene is viewed from.  In "circular" polarizing filters, the polarizing effect works when the scene is viewed from the male threaded (back) side of the filter, but does not work when looking through it backwards.

Other effects 

Polarizing filters reduce the light passed through to the film or sensor by about one to three stops (2–8×) depending on how much of the light is polarized at the filter angle selected. Auto-exposure cameras will adjust for this by widening the aperture, lengthening the time the shutter is open, and/or increasing the ASA/ISO speed of the camera.  Polarizing filters can be used deliberately to reduce available light and allow use of wider apertures to shorten depth of field for certain focus effects.

Some companies make adjustable neutral density filters by having two linear polarizing layers. When they are at 90° to each other, they let almost zero light in, admitting more as the angle decreases.

See also
 Polarized 3D glasses

References

External links
 Polarizer another must-have filter

Optical filters
Polarization (waves)
Articles containing video clips